Terra de Areia is a municipality in the state of Rio Grande do Sul, Brazil.

The municipality contains the  Mata Paludosa Biological Reserve, created in 1998, a fully protected conservation unit.

See also
List of municipalities in Rio Grande do Sul

References

Populated coastal places in Rio Grande do Sul
Municipalities in Rio Grande do Sul